The men's 4 × 100 metres relay event at the 2006 African Championships in Athletics was held at the Stade Germain Comarmond on August 11.

Results

References
 Many sources, including the IAAF list the leadoff runner as Grace Ebor, a female Nigerian middle-distance runner. This is incorrect as the leadoff runner was Peter Emelieze.

Results 
Results

2006 African Championships in Athletics
Relays at the African Championships in Athletics